Francesco Rosa (died 1687) was an Italian painter from Genoa.  His works include The Glory of the Eternal Father at Santa Caterina a Magnanapoli and Moses at the Pantheon, both in Rome.  Gregorio Lazzarini trained under him.

External links

http://www.artnet.com/artist/691715/francesco-rosa.html

17th-century Italian painters
Italian male painters
Painters from Genoa
1687 deaths
Year of birth unknown